George Stanley "Mugs" Halas Jr. (September 4, 1925 – December 16, 1979) was an American football executive who is one of four presidents in the history of the Chicago Bears franchise of the National Football League (NFL). He was the son of Bears founder and NFL co-founder George Halas and Minnie Bushing. He went to the Loyola University Chicago Quinlan School of Business. George Jr. joined the Bears' front office in 1950. He became treasurer in 1953 and president of the club in 1963. He also nominally served as general manager until 1974, though his father continued to have the final say on football matters during this time.

Halas had intended for Mugs to inherit the team upon his death. However, Mugs died on the last day of the 1979 regular season from a sudden heart attack. Thus, upon George Sr.'s death in 1983, Mugs' older sister, Virginia Halas McCaskey, inherited the team.

Mugs was married to Therese until their divorce in 1975. The couple had two children, Christine and Stephen. Following Mugs' death, a legal battle brewed between the three and the Halas-McCaskey family over their inheritance, life insurance payout, stake in ownership. In 1987, Mugs' remains were exhumed and subjected to a second autopsy at the request Therese and her children. The forensic pathologist conducting the autopsy noted that many of Mugs' internal organs, including his heart, lungs, and spinal cord, had been replaced with sawdust. Therese's attorney, William J. Harte, alleged that Mugs' death was not due to natural causes, and thus subject to further insurance payouts. An Illinois appellate court rejected Therese's petition in 1988.

The George Halas Jr. Sports Center was dedicated on September 2, 1982, on the campus of Loyola University Chicago. He was a graduate of Loyola University's School of Commerce.

References

1925 births
1979 deaths
Chicago Bears executives
National Football League team presidents
National Football League general managers
Loyola University Chicago alumni
Halas family
20th-century American businesspeople